A sympiesometer is a compact and lightweight type of barometer that was widely used on ships in the 19th century.  The sensitivity of this barometer was also used to measure altitude.

The sympiesometer consists of two parts. One is a traditional mercury thermometer that is needed to calculate the expansion or contraction of the fluid in the barometer proper. The other is the barometer, consisting of a J-shaped tube open at the lower end and closed at the top, with small reservoirs at both ends of the tube. The lower end of the J and its associated reservoir were filled with colored almond oil, while the upper portion and its reservoir were filled with hydrogen gas. Increasing air pressure would cause the oil to be pushed out of the lower reservoir and into the tube, compressing the hydrogen gas into the upper reservoir. The pressure was indicated by the position of the top of the oil. To correct for temperature, a sliding scale was used; the operator would first use the thermometer to set the scale and then measure the pressure from it.

The basic idea is similar to the common weather glass that had been in use for some time, but the use of highly compressible hydrogen in a long, thin tube allowed much more accurate measurements, as changes in pressure resulted in much more movement of the liquid. The basic concept was initially demonstrated by Robert Hooke, which he referred to as the Otheometer. However it remained unused until it was re-introduced by Alexander Adie.

References

Pressure gauges
Meteorological instrumentation and equipment
Scottish inventions